Preska may refer to:

 Loretta Preska, Judge of the United States District Court for the Southern District of New York
 Preska nad Kostrevnico in the Municipality of Litija
 Preska pri Dobrniču in the Municipality of Trebnje
 Preska pri Medvodah in the Municipality of Medvode
 Preska, Sevnica in the Municipality of Sevnica
 Preska, Sodražica in the Municipality of Sodražica